Eugene Gerson "Gene" Glazer (born November 24, 1939) is an American former foil fencer.

Early and personal life
Glazer was born in New York City, lived in Flushing, Queens, New York, and is Jewish. He became a securities analyst after college.

Fencing career
In 1958, Glazer was third in the Amateur Fencers League of America National Championships in foil.

Glazer fenced for New York University.  In 1960, he won the NCAA National Championship in foil with a 24–2 record while he was a junior. He also fenced for the Fencers Club of New York.

Fencing for the United States, Glazer won a gold medal in team foil at the 1959 Pan American Games.

Glazer competed at the 1960 Summer Olympics (individual and team foil) in Rome at the age of 20, and the 1964 Summer Olympics (team foil) in Tokyo at the age of 24.

He was inducted into the NYU Athletics Hall of Fame in 1984.

References

External links
 

1939 births
Living people
Jewish male foil fencers
Jewish American sportspeople
American male foil fencers
Olympic fencers of the United States
Fencers at the 1960 Summer Olympics
Fencers at the 1964 Summer Olympics
Sportspeople from New York (state)
Pan American Games medalists in fencing
Pan American Games gold medalists for the United States
Fencers at the 1959 Pan American Games
21st-century American Jews
Medalists at the 1959 Pan American Games